The Peoples Gas Building at 122 South Michigan Avenue on the corner of Adams Street in the Loop community area of Chicago, Illinois.

Description and history 
The  21-story office building was built from 1910 to 1911 and was designed by D.H. Burnham & Company.

The building was added to the National Register of Historic Places in 1984, and is also a contributing property for Chicago's Michigan Boulevard Historic District.

Since November 5, 2012, the building's sixteenth floor has hosted the chancery of the Philippine Consulate General in Chicago.

Tenants
Axa Assistance

References
Notes

External links

Commercial buildings on the National Register of Historic Places in Chicago
Skyscraper office buildings in Chicago
1911 establishments in Illinois
Office buildings completed in 1911
Chicago school architecture in Illinois